Xylocalyx aculeolatus is a species of plant in the family Orobanchaceae. It is endemic to Yemen.  Its natural habitat is subtropical or tropical dry shrubland.

References

aculeolatus
Endemic flora of Socotra
Least concern plants
Least concern biota of Asia
Taxonomy articles created by Polbot